Lithuanian Archery Championships is the national championship in archery, organized by the Lithuanian Archery Federation. The first competition was held in 1961 in Šiauliai.

Championships

References

External links
Lithuanian archery 

 
Recurring sporting events established in 1961
1961 establishments in Lithuania
Annual events in Lithuania
National archery competitions
Archery competitions in Lithuania
Summer events in Lithuania